Zoetrope Interactive is an independent game developer located in Istanbul, Turkey. Their mission is to develop quality games in which gamers will enjoy a unique gaming experience. One of the notable products they have developed is Darkness Within 2: The Dark Lineage and their proprietary panoramic game engine, CPAGE. Studio changed its name to Stormling Studios and released their new game Transient.

Games 
 Darkness Within: In Pursuit of Loath Nolder (2007)
 Darkness Within 2: The Dark Lineage (2009)
 Conarium (2017)
 Transient (2020)

Team
Galip Kartoğlu - Software
Onur Şamlı - Graphics
Oral Şamlı - Graphics

References

External links 
Zoetrope Interactive
Darkness Within: In Pursuit of Loath Nolder official website
Transcend

Video game development companies
Video game companies of Turkey